Guido Rossi (16 March 1931 – 21 August 2017) was an Italian jurist, lawyer, and politician.

Biography 
Rossi was born in Milan on 16 March 1931. He studied at the Ghislieri College from 1948 to 1953, and graduated in law from the University of Pavia. In 1954, he obtained a Master of Laws at Harvard University. As a former professor of commercial law, comparative private law, and philosophy of law in Trieste, Venice, Pavia, and Milan at the Statale, Bocconi, and Vita-Salute San Raffaele universities, he was appointed president of Consob, Italy's equivalent of the Securities and Exchange Commission, in 1981. A member of the Senate of the Republic for the Italian Communist Party and later the Independent Left in the Legislature X of Italy from 1987 to 1992, he was the promoter of antitrust legislation in Italy. He later led Ferruzzi-Montedison, and then Telecom Italia.

For a year in the 2000s, Rossi defended the Dutch bank Abn Amro. In 2003, he defended Cesare Geronzi, the president of Capitalia, who was involved in the Cirio and Parmalat scandals. In 2006, he was appointed extraordinary commissioner of the Italian Football Federation (FIGC) to manage the emergency situation created after the Calciopoli scandal. On 15 September 2006, following the resignation of Marco Tronchetti Provera, he was reappointed president of Telecom Italia, and told a parliamentary committee in Rome that the company would cut its debt to €38 billion by the end of the year from €41.3 billion in June. He held this position until 6 April 2007. In 2008, in an attempt to relaunch the company in crisis of sales, he became a consultant for Fiat.

Rossi was editor-in-chief of Rivista delle Società and director of the Banca, Borsa e Titoli di Credito magazine, as well as a columnist for il manifesto and Il Sole 24 Ore. On 4 May 2011, he was appointed ethical guarantor of Consob, a position from which he resigned on 26 October 2012. In 2013, he described Bitcoin as "a risky instrument", and compared it to derivatives, and said it "can overturn the rules of capitalism." Rossi died in Milan on 21 August 2017, aged 86. He is survived by his wife Francesca and their daughters Sara  and Livia, as well as a daughter from his previous marriage to Alessandra. As an atheist and in line with his personal views, no funeral was held. In 2018, his name was inscribed in the Famedio inside the Monumental Cemetery of Milan.

Calciopoli 
His stint as the FIGC's extraordinary commissioner during the Calciopoli scandal, as well as his role in the scandal's investigation, and the 26 July 2006 decision to award third-placed Inter Milan the 2005–06 Serie A title after penalties for the other clubs, were controversial. Rossi was an avowed supporter of Inter Milan, an association football club of which he served as a member of the board of directors from 1995 to 1999. He was accused of partiality and conflict of interest, charges that Rossi denied.

In an interview with the Corriere della Sera, former FIGC president Franco Carraro said that Rossi, with regard to the assignment of the title, had been badly advised by the experts, the Three Sages (Gerhard Aigner, Massimo Coccia, and Roberto Pardolesi), he appointed. Aigner denied this, saying that his task and that of the other two experts was to verify whether the statutes and regulations of UEFA, FIGC, and Lega Calcio allowed for the possibility of creating a different standings after the penalty of some clubs. According to Aigner, the rules granted this possibility and the task of experts was limited to confirming it to Rossi who, once he had acquired the legal opinion, autonomously decreed the assignment of the scudetto.

Books

Explanatory notes

References

Further reading

External links 
 Centro Studi Guido Rossi at Ghislieri Foundation (in Italian)
 Guido Rossi at Goodreads (in English)
 Guido Rossi at Radio Radicale (in Italian)
 Guido Rossi at Senato.it (in Italian)
 Guido Rossi at Il Sole 24 Ore (in Italian)

1931 births
2017 deaths
Harvard Law School alumni
Inter Milan chairmen and investors
Italian Communist Party politicians
Italian jurists
Italian lawyers
Italian politicians
Politicians from Milan
Senators of Legislature X of Italy
University of Pavia alumni